DIY stands for Do it yourself.

DIY may also refer to:

Do it yourself
 Hardware stores, also called "DIY stores", selling equipment for home improvement directly to consumers
 DIY Network, a television channel focusing on home do-it-yourself projects
 DIY audio, do-it-yourself audio equipment
 DIY ethic, the ethic of being self-reliant as opposed to relying on professionals
 DIY moving, do-it-yourself packing and moving
 DIY networking, different types of grassroots networking
 DIY birth or unassisted birth, the process of intentionally giving birth without the assistance of a medical or professional birth attendant
 Do-it-yourself biology

Music
 DIY music, another name for lo-fi music
 DIY♡ (Dance in Your Heart), a Hello! Project musical group created as part of the Satoyama Movement
 DiY Sound System, an English musical collective
 DIY (magazine), a United Kingdom-based music magazine

Albums
 Do It Yourself (Ian Dury & the Blockheads album), 1979
 Do It Yourself (The Seahorses album), 1997

Songs
 "D.I.Y.", a 1978 song by Peter Gabriel from his second solo album Peter Gabriel (1978 album)
 "D.I.Y.", a 1999 song by KMFDM from Adios
 "DIY", a 2011 song by Savoy
 "D.I.Y", a 2014 song by Paul Heaton and Jacqui Abbott from What Have We Become?
 "DIY", a 2022 song by Stela Cole who represented Georgia in the American Song Contest

Other uses
 Diyarbakır Airport (IATA code)
 DIY (professional wrestling), a professional wrestling tag team
 DiY-Fest, a festival of ultra-independent movies, books, zines, music, poetry, and performance art 1999–2002
 Special Region of Yogyakarta (Daerah Istimewa Yogyakarta), a province-level region in Indonesia
 WarioWare D.I.Y., a video game for the Nintendo DS
 Do It Yourself!!, a Japanese original anime television series